You Are My Lady is a 1985 single by Freddie Jackson that followed his debut single, "Rock Me Tonight (For Old Times Sake)."  It was the second single from his debut album, Rock Me Tonight.  Like his debut single, "You Are My Lady" hit number one  on the R&B charts for two weeks, and was Jackson's most successful crossover single of his career, peaking at 12 on the Hot 100.  It also reached number 49 in the UK.

Chart history

See also
 List of number-one R&B singles of 1985 (U.S.)

References

1985 singles
Freddie Jackson songs
Songs written by Barry Eastmond
1985 songs
Capitol Records singles
1980s ballads
Contemporary R&B ballads
Soul ballads